LMT Regbija klubs Eži is a Latvian rugby club based in Riga.

History
The club was founded on 25 April 1995.

External links
LMT Regbija klubs Eži

Latvian rugby union teams
Sport in Riga